Malaysian Airline System Flight 653 (MH653) was a scheduled domestic flight from Penang to Kuala Lumpur in Malaysia, operated by Malaysian Airline System (MAS). On the evening of 4 December 1977, the Boeing 737-200 aircraft flying the service crashed at Tanjung Kupang, Johor, Malaysia, while purportedly being diverted by hijackers to Singapore. It was the first fatal air crash for Malaysia Airlines (as the airline is now known), with all 93 passengers and 7 crew killed. It is also the deadliest aviation disaster to occur on Malaysian soil. The flight was apparently hijacked as soon as it reached cruise altitude. The circumstances in which the hijacking and subsequent crash occurred remain unsolved.

Aircraft
The aircraft involved was a Boeing 737-2H6 registered as  It had been delivered new to MAS in September 1972 with registration

Sequence of events
Flight 653 departed from Runway 22 at Penang International Airport at exactly 19:21 for Kuala Lumpur's Subang Airport (now known as Sultan Abdul Aziz Shah Airport).

Subsequently, the pilots were forced to cut off all communications by a group of hijackers who suddenly barged into the cockpit. The tower immediately notified the authorities, who made emergency preparations at the airport.

A few minutes later, the crew radioed: "We're now proceeding to Singapore. Good night." In the last few minutes of the tapes from the cockpit voice recorder, investigators heard conversation between the pilots and the hijackers about how the aircraft would run out of fuel before it could make it to Singapore, followed by a series of gunshots. They concluded that both the pilot and co-pilot were fatally shot by the hijacker, which left the plane "professionally uncontrolled". At 20:15, all communication with the aircraft was lost. At 20:36, the residents of Kampong Ladang, Tanjung Kupang in Johor reported hearing explosions and seeing burning wreckage in a swamp. The wreckage was later identified as the aircraft;  it had hit the ground at a near-vertical angle at a very high speed. There were no survivors.

Investigation and aftermath 

The full circumstances of the hijacking and crash were never solved. However, airport officials at Kuala Lumpur said pilots had radioed that members of the Japanese Red Army had hijacked the plane. In 1996, while reporting about the hijacking and crash of Ethiopian Airlines Flight 961, CNN reporters wrote that the hijackers were in fact identified as Red Army members, but this has not been confirmed. All recovered remains were x-rayed in an attempt to discover evidence of a projectile or weapon, but no such evidence was ever found. The remains of the victims were interred in a mass burial.

After the incident, the Aviation Security Unit of the Airport Standard Division of the Department of Civil Aviation Malaysia was established.

Passengers and crew 

Passengers included the Malaysian Agricultural Minister, Dato' Ali Haji Ahmad; Public Works Department Head, Dato' Mahfuz Khalid; and Cuban Ambassador to Japan, Mario García Incháustegui.

Among the flight's cabin crew perished in the crash is Onn Jaafar, nephew of then Malaysian Prime Minister, Hussein Onn.

See also
Air Vietnam Flight 706

Notes

References 

1977 in Malaysia
Accidents and incidents involving the Boeing 737 Original
Aircraft hijackings
Airliner accidents and incidents caused by hijacking
Aviation accidents and incidents in 1977
Aviation accidents and incidents in Malaysia
653
Mass murder in 1977
Terrorist incidents in Malaysia
December 1977 events in Asia
Terrorist incidents by unknown perpetrators
Terrorist incidents in Malaysia in 1977
1977 crimes in Malaysia